FC Kazakhmys is a defunct Kazakhstani football club. They were based in Satpayev, Karagandy Province. They won the First Division 2007, but were not able to start in the Premier League 2008 due to financial difficulties. In the 2008 season, the club became champion again and promoted to the Kazakhstan Premier League. In May 2011, due to lack of funds, it was announced the discontinuity of the club. In 2015, Gadaleta Investment LLP (a company registered in Bermuda) expressed its interest in taking over the relevant licence and franchise through the Molfetta Eurasia Sport Trust.

League results

Achievements
Kazakhstan First Division: 2
2007, 2008

References

External links
Official site

Defunct football clubs in Kazakhstan
Association football clubs established in 2006
2006 establishments in Kazakhstan
Kazakhmys